Michael Wiebe is a Canadian politician in Vancouver, British Columbia, who was elected to Vancouver City Council running under the Vancouver Green Party slate in the October 2018 municipal election. Wiebe had previously served on the Vancouver Park Board as a commissioner.

In 2020, an independent conflict-of-interest investigation concluded that Wiebe had violated conflict-of-interest rules, and recommended his resignation or removal. Wiebe denied wrongdoing saying that he had a "good faith belief that [he] did not have a conflict".

Electoral record

References 

Green Party of Vancouver councillors
Year of birth missing (living people)
Living people
21st-century Canadian politicians